Pandie Pandie Station, most commonly known as Pandie Pandie, also often spelled as Pandi Pandi or Pandy Pandy, is a pastoral lease that operates as a cattle station in north east South Australia. It lies on the eastern edge of Karanguru territory.

It is also situated toward the northern end of the Birdsville Track.

History
The station was established in 1876 by Robert Frew along with other properties in the area including Annandale, Alton Downs and Planet Downs. Nearby Haddon Downs station was also taken up by Frew in 1877.

Frew still owned the property in 1881 when he renamed the town of Diamantina Crossing to its present name of Birdsville after being amazed at the amount of birdlife found around the area.

By 1903 Sidney Kidman owned the property, and at this time it was completely destocked after suffering the effects of drought and the death of many cattle.

In 1938, the station was acquired by the Morton family, who held it for 70 years until 2008.

It was sold for 7.5 million to Viv Oldfield with 7800 head of cattle.

The manager of Pandie Pandie is Peter Morton (Pandie Pete). The station runs Brahman cattle.

The land occupying the extent of the Pandie Pandie pastoral lease was gazetted as a locality in April 2013 under the name 'Pandie Pandie'.

See also 
 List of ranches and stations
 List of reduplicated Australian place names

References 

Stations (Australian agriculture)
Pastoral leases in South Australia
Far North (South Australia)
1876 establishments in Australia